Helmut Wolf was an Italian para-alpine skier. He represented Italy at the 1992 Winter Paralympics, at the 1994 Winter Paralympics and at the 1998 Winter Paralympics.

In 1994 he won the silver medals in the Men's Downhill LWX and Men's Super-G LWX events.

See also 
 List of Paralympic medalists in alpine skiing

References 

Paralympic alpine skiers of Italy
Alpine skiers at the 1992 Winter Paralympics
Alpine skiers at the 1994 Winter Paralympics
Alpine skiers at the 1998 Winter Paralympics
Medalists at the 1994 Winter Paralympics
Paralympic silver medalists for Italy
Paralympic medalists in alpine skiing
20th-century Italian people